The State of Jefferson is a proposed U.S. state that would span the contiguous, mostly rural area of southern Oregon and Northern California, where several attempts to separate from Oregon and California, respectively, have taken place. The region encompasses most of Northern California's land but does not include San Francisco or other Bay Area counties that account for the majority of Northern California's population.

The name "Jefferson" is of uncertain origin. It has been historically used for other proposed territories or states, too, such as the 19th century "Jefferson Territory," as well as a southern state that would be created from the Texas Panhandle region, as proposed by a 1915 bill in the Texas Legislature. However, this region on the Pacific Coast is the most famous.

President Thomas Jefferson, who sent the Lewis and Clark Expedition into the Pacific Northwest in 1803, envisioned the establishment of an independent nation in the western portion of North America that he dubbed the "Republic of the Pacific"; hence the association of his name with regional autonomy. The movement for independence, rather than statehood, is known as Cascadia.

If the proposal were ever approved, the new state's capital city would have to be determined by a constitutional convention; Yreka, California, was named the provisional capital in the original 1941 proposal, although Port Orford, Oregon, had also been up for consideration. Some supporters of the more recent revival have also identified Redding, California, as a potential capital, even though Redding is not included in all versions of the proposal and its city council voted in 2013 to reject participation in the movement.

19th century 
The State of Jefferson has its  origins in the 19th century. In 1851, gold discovered in the Klamath river basin of Northwest California extended California's gold rush further north to the Klamath river basin and into the Rogue River valley of Southern Oregon. This led to the first large influx of white settlers in the area, causing conflict with local Native populations that eventually culminated in the Rogue River War of 1855-1856.

Furthermore, this influx of American settlers coupled with the wealth they were able to accumulate from the natural resources of the region spurred several political movements that wanted to separate this region from the rest of California and Oregon in the 1850's. Local politicians proposed an independent State of Shasta to the California legislature in 1852, but the bill died in committee. The State of Shasta was revived again in 1855, and various other configurations of an independent state in the same region as the State of Jefferson were proposed throughout the decade (such as the State of Klamath in 1853 and 1854).

The settlers of the region believed that they were distinct from the rest of California and Oregon both culturally and economically, and that because of the large distance separating them from the capitals of California and Oregon, their needs would be better addressed at the local and federal levels by their own State government than by petitioning the California government. In 1860, Congress passed legislation that would allow the region to vote on whether they wanted to be independent from California and Oregon, but the Civil War interrupted this process and quelled independence movements for the rest of the 19th century.

20th century

In October 1941, the Mayor of Port Orford, Oregon, Gilbert Gable, said that the Oregon counties of Curry, Josephine, Jackson, and Klamath should join with the California counties of Del Norte, Siskiyou, and Modoc to form a new state, later named Jefferson.

He was motivated by the belief that these heavily rural areas were underrepresented in state government, which tended to cater to more populous areas. Gilbert Gable was joined in his efforts by Siskiyou State Senator Randolph Collier, whose support led to Yreka being picked as the capital.

On November 27, 1941, a group of young men gained national media attention when, brandishing rifles and pistols, stopped traffic on U.S. Route 99 south of Yreka, the county seat of Siskiyou County, and handed out copies of a Proclamation of Independence, stating that the State of Jefferson was in "patriotic rebellion against the States of California and Oregon" and would continue to "secede every Thursday until further notice."

The state split movement ended quickly, though not before Del Norte County District Attorney John Leon Childs (1863–1953) of Crescent City was inaugurated as the Governor of the State of Jefferson on December 4, 1941.

The first blow was the death of Mayor Gable on December 2, followed by the attack on Pearl Harbor on December 7. Those in favor of splitting the state focused their efforts on the war effort, which crippled the movement.

San Francisco Chronicle journalist Stanton Delaplane won the 1942 Pulitzer Prize for Reporting for his articles on the State of Jefferson.

In 1989, KSOR, the National Public Radio member station based at Southern Oregon University in Ashland, near Medford, rebranded itself as Jefferson Public Radio. It had built a massive network of low-powered translators earlier in the 1980s. By the time KSOR began building full-power stations later in the decade, it realized that the combined footprint of its translator network was roughly coextensive with the original State of Jefferson. It thus felt "Jefferson Public Radio" was an appropriate name when it decided to rebrand itself as a network.

In 1992, California State Assemblyman Stan Statham placed an advisory vote in 31 counties asking if the state should be split into two. All of the proposed Jefferson counties voted in favor of the split (except Humboldt County which did not have the issue on the ballot). Based on these results, Statham introduced legislation in California in an attempt to split the state, but the bill died in committee.

In the late 1990s, the movement for statehood was promoted by a group called the State of Jefferson Citizens Committee, which was originally formed in 1941. Two of the members, Brian Helsaple and Brian Petersen, gathered an extensive collection, including both verbal and written accounts mostly surrounding the 1941 movement. They published a book, Jefferson Saga, in 2000. This, along with revealing the lack of representation and over-regulations, fanned the flame.

21st century
Jefferson is commemorated by the State of Jefferson Scenic Byway between Yreka and O'Brien, Oregon, which runs  along State Route 96 and U.S. Forest Service Primary Route 48. Near the California – Oregon border, a turnout provides scenic views of the Klamath River valley and three informative display signs about the republic. The region retains this identity reinforced by institutions such as Jefferson Public Radio.

As of the 2020 Census, if the Jefferson counties were a state (original 1941 counties), the state's population would be 484,727: smaller than any state at the time. Approximately 83% of those residents live in Oregon. Its land area would be  – a little smaller than West Virginia. The area was almost evenly divided between Oregon and California. Its population density would be  – a little more than Idaho. With the addition of the more modern Jefferson movement (Coos and Douglas and Lake Counties in Oregon, and Humboldt, Trinity, Shasta, Lassen, Mendocino, Lake, Tehama, Plumas, Glenn, Butte, Colusa, Sierra, Sutter, Yuba, Nevada, Placer, El Dorado, Amador, Calaveras, Tuolumne, Stanislaus, Siskiyou and Mariposa Counties in California), the population as of the 2020 Census would be 3,138,324, making it the 33rd most populous state in the United States.

Counties intending to leave California
On September 3, 2013, the Siskiyou County, California Board of Supervisors voted 4 to 1 in favor of withdrawal from California to form a proposed state named Jefferson. The proposal was joined by the Modoc County Board of Supervisors (September 24) and Glenn County Board of Supervisors (January 21, 2014). On April 15, 2014 Yuba County Supervisors joined the State of Jefferson movement to separate from California and create a new U.S. state. On July 15, 2014, the Tehama County Board of Supervisors voted unanimously to adopt a resolution supporting the declaration of withdrawal from California based on an advisory vote taken on June 6, 2014, where the public voted 56% to 44% in favor of splitting the state.  On July 22, 2014, the Board of Supervisors of Sutter County unanimously adopted a resolution supporting a declaration and petition to the Legislature to withdraw from California to redress a lack of representation. On March 3, 2015, Lake County supervisors voted 3 to 2 to submit the question of secession to voters and on March 17, Lassen County supervisors made a similar declaration that also has the voters deciding in 2016.  The Jefferson Declaration Committee is reportedly aiming to get at least 12 counties in support.

On October 24, 2014, Modoc and Siskiyou Counties delivered their declarations for independence from the state of California to the California Secretary of State's office. On January 15, 2015, three more counties, Glenn, Tehama, and Yuba, submitted their official declarations as well.

The 2013 revival was based almost entirely in California. It includes all major parts of California north of 39°. Although some individual residents in Oregon have lobbied for the movement, no county government in that state has endorsed the proposal to date. As of January 6, 2016, 21 northern California counties have sent a declaration or have approved to send a declaration to the State of California with their intent of leaving the state and forming the State of Jefferson. The population of the 21 California counties was 1,747,626 as of the 2010 U.S. Census, which would be 39th most populous state in the Union.

2016 presidential election

After the 2016 presidential election, it was noted that most of the rural California counties which would belong to the State of Jefferson were won in a landslide by Republican nominee Donald Trump, whereas Democrat Hillary Clinton enjoyed an unprecedented level of support in the rest of California, indicating a growing demographic and political divide between the proposed State of Jefferson and the rest of California. While Clinton beat Trump by almost 80 points in San Francisco, he led her by more than 50 points in Lassen County. The election of Trump led to calls for a secession of California from the Union and a similar proposal in Oregon, where Clinton won the popular vote while Trump captured the majority of counties.

With the election of President Donald Trump, some who are considering joining the modern State of Jefferson or are observing the movement have stated that if California secedes, the movement's supporting counties could appeal directly to the United States Congress for statehood, similar to how West Virginia was formed, claiming California would be in insurrection and petitioning to rejoin the Union as an independent state.

On May 8, 2017, the State of Jefferson as "Citizens for Fair Representation" filed a lawsuit against the California Secretary of State Alex Padilla. The suit alleges that California's 1862 law limiting Senators to no more than 40, and Assembly Members to no more than 80, creates an unconstitutional imbalance of representation that precludes effective "self-governance" as protected by the 14th Amendment. The desired result of suing California, for lack of representation and dilution of vote, is better representation across all of California, and ultimately an independent State of Jefferson. The case was dismissed by the lower court and appealed to the Ninth Circuit.

Flag and seal

The field of the flag is green, and the charge is the Seal of the State of Jefferson: a yellow circle representing a gold mining pan, with the words "The Great Seal Of State Of Jefferson" engraved into the lip, and two capital, black Xs askew of each other.

The two Xs are known as the "Double Cross" and signify the two regions' "sense of abandonment" by the central state governments, in both Southern Oregon and Northern California.

The gold pan that was ostensibly the first model for the state's seal is on display at the Siskiyou County Museum, in Yreka, California.

Appearances in popular culture
Jefferson was featured by Huell Howser in Road Trip Episode 143.

See also

Absaroka (proposed state)
American Redoubt
California National Party
Cascadia (independence movement)
Franklin (proposed state)
Jefferson (proposed Mountain state)
Jefferson (proposed Southern state)
Lincoln (proposed Northwestern state)
Lincoln (proposed Southern state)
List of U.S. state partition proposals
Partition and secession in California
Superior (proposed U.S. state)
State of Sequoyah
Secession in the United States
Northwest Territorial Imperative
Yes California Independence Campaign

Notes

References

Further reading
 James T. Rock. The State of Jefferson: the Dream Lives on! Siskiyou County Museum, 1999.

External links

 State Of Jefferson Home Page — History of the State
 Jefferson Public Radio
 Jefferson Public Radio on the State of Jefferson
 State of Jefferson by Ian Jones
 The Mythical State of Jefferson by Megan Shaw at Bad Subjects
 A State of Mind:Exploring the untamed wonders of Jefferson by Glenn Garnett at CottageLink Magazine
 A Jefferson State of Mind  by Christopher Hall at AAA's Via Magazine
 The Jefferson Proposal Official Jefferson State Joint Committee website
 The State of Jefferson Images of America series (Google Books)
 State of Jefferson Documentary produced by Oregon Public Broadcasting
 State of Jefferson Formation site Primary website for the 2013+ modern statehood movement
 Jefferson Declaration Blog  Very active movement for withdrawal of the rural northern California counties to form a new state of Jefferson

Proposed states and territories of the United States
Jefferson, State of
History of Siskiyou County, California
Jefferson, State of
Yreka, California
California secessionism